Yang Yuelou (1844–17 July 1890) was a Qing dynasty Peking opera artist based in Beijing, who specialized in playing sheng roles, or men. He is probably best known today for his 1873 conviction in Shanghai, under judicial torture, of abducting the daughter of a wealthy comprador. This case drew widespread attention at the time, and much later was adapted to film and television.

His third son Yang Xiaolou was also a famous Peking opera performer.

In popular culture
Several actors have starred as Yang Yuelou in dramatizations of his 1873 case: Henry Lo in the 1986 Hong Kong TV series Four Strange Cases of the Late Qing Dynasty, Xu Xiaojian in the 1996 Chinese TV series The Incredible Injustice to an Opera Actor, and Mark Cheng in the 1999 Chinese martial arts film Tragedy On and Off the Stage.

References

Chinese male Peking opera actors
People from Huaining County
19th-century Chinese male actors
19th-century Chinese male singers
Male actors from Anhui
Singers from Anhui
1844 births
1890 deaths